The 2015 Australian Carrera Cup Championship was an Australian motor racing competition for Porsche 911 GT3 Cup cars. It was sanctioned by the Confederation of Australian Motor Sport (CAMS) as a national championship with Porsche Cars Australia Pty Ltd appointed as the Category Manager by CAMS. The title, which was the eleventh Porsche Carrera Cup Australia Championship, was won by Nick Foster.

Sonic Motor Racing Services driver Foster won eight races during the season, with two runs of four consecutive victories including weekend sweeps at Townsville and Sandown. Foster finished sixty-four points ahead of Finance EZI Racing's David Russell, who took eleven podium finishes during the season but only one win, at Bathurst. Third place in the championship went to Matt Campbell (McElrea Racing), who won six races, including a weekend sweep at Surfers Paradise as part of a four-race win streak to close the season. Defending champion Steven Richards won five of the first six races, but only returned to the podium four times over the remaining sixteen races to finish fourth in the championship. Foster's teammate Nick McBride and Hamilton Autohaus driver Shane Smollen were the other race-winners, winning at Albert Park and Phillip Island respectively. Foster also won the Professional sub-classification by 46 points, while Smollen won the Elite sub-classification by 60 points ahead of Stephen Grove.

Teams and drivers

The following teams and drivers contested the championship.

All vehicles were Porsche 911 GT3 Cup Type 991 cars, as mandated by the championship regulations.

Race calendar
The championship was contested over eight rounds.

Championship standings
Points system
Championship points were awarded at each race as per the table below:

Each driver was deemed by the Category Manager to be in either the Professional Class or the Elite Class for the purpose of awarding class points.
For class awards, each driver in each class who was classified as a finisher received points in accordance with the above pointscore table relative to each other driver in their class.

Overall

Professional

Elite

Notes

References

External links

 

Australian Carrera Cup Championship seasons
Carrera Cup Championship